The 2009 Tajik Cup was the 18th edition of the Tajik Cup.

First round

|}

Quarterfinals

|}

Semifinals

|}

Final

References

External links
Tajikistan Football Federation
RSSSF 2009

Tajikistan Cup
Tajikistan
Tajik Cup